March is the debut album of singer-songwriter Michael Penn, released in 1989.

It featured the singles "No Myth", "This and That", and "Brave New World".  In 1990, "No Myth" peaked at No.22 on the Billboard Hot Adult Contemporary Tracks chart, number five on the Mainstream Rock Tracks chart, number four on the Modern Rock Tracks chart, and No.13 on the Billboard Hot 100.  "This and That" reached No.10 on the Modern Rock Tracks chart.  "Brave New World" reached No.20 on the Modern Rock Tracks chart and No.26 on the Mainstream Rock Tracks chart.

Track listing 
All tracks written by Michael Penn, except where noted.

 "No Myth" (4:10)
 "Half Harvest" (4:05)
 "This & That" (3:31)
 "Brave New World" (4:32)
 "Innocent One" (3:16)
 "Disney's a Snow Cone/Bedlam Boys" (5:11) (Penn, Patrick Warren)
 "Invisible" (3:45)
 "Cupid's Got a Brand New Gun" (3:27)
 "Big House" (2:56)
 "Battle Room" (3:37)
 "Evenfall" (3:54)

Personnel 
 Michael Penn – vocals, bass, guitar, drum programming
 Peter Blegvad – background vocals
 Jim Keltner – drums
 Jimmy Haslip – bass
 Kenny Aronoff – drums
 Tony Berg – guitar, keyboards
 Boni Boyer – background vocals
 David Coleman – cello, oud, daff
 Lisa Coleman – keyboards
 Larry Klein – bass
 Wendy Melvoin – bass, guitar, drum programming
 John Pierce – bass
 Patrick Warren – percussion, keyboards, drum programming
 Art Wood – percussion
 Diane Charlemagne – background vocals
 Charlie Sexton – guitar
 Gary Ferguson – drums, percussion

Charts

References

External links 
 March at michaelpenn.com
 

1989 debut albums
Michael Penn albums
Albums produced by Tony Berg
RCA Records albums